Dương Quang may refer to several places in Vietnam, including:

, a rural commune of Gia Lâm District
Dương Quang, Bắc Kạn, a rural commune of Bắc Kạn city
, a rural commune of Mỹ Hào